The truncated rhombicuboctahedron is a polyhedron, constructed as a truncation of the rhombicuboctahedron. It has 50 faces consisting of 18 octagons, 8 hexagons, and 24 squares. 
It can fill space with the truncated cube, truncated tetrahedron and triangular prism as a truncated runcic cubic honeycomb.

Other names
Truncated small rhombicuboctahedron
Beveled cuboctahedron

Zonohedron 

As a zonohedron, it can be constructed with all but 12 octagons as regular polygons. It has two sets of 48 vertices existing on two distances from its center.

It represents the Minkowski sum of a cube, a truncated octahedron, and a rhombic dodecahedron.

Excavated truncated rhombicuboctahedron 

The excavated truncated rhombicuboctahedron is a toroidal polyhedron, constructed from a truncated rhombicuboctahedron with its 12 irregular octagonal faces removed. It comprises a network of 6 square cupolae, 8 triangular cupolae, and 24 triangular prisms.  It has 148 faces (8 triangles, 126 squares, 8 hexagons, and 6 octagons), 312 edges, and 144 vertices. With Euler characteristic χ = f + v - e = -20, its genus (g = (2-χ)/2) is 11.

Without the triangular prisms, the toroidal polyhedron becomes a truncated cuboctahedron.

Related polyhedra

The truncated cuboctahedron is similar, with all regular faces, and 4.6.8 vertex figure.

The triangle and squares of the rhombicuboctahedron can be independently rectified or truncated, creating four permutations of polyhedra. The partially truncated forms can be seen as edge contractions of the truncated form.

The truncated rhombicuboctahedron can be seen in sequence of rectification and truncation operations from the cuboctahedron. A further alternation step leads to the snub rhombicuboctahedron.

See also
 Expanded cuboctahedron
 Truncated rhombicosidodecahedron

References

 
 Coxeter Regular Polytopes, Third edition, (1973), Dover edition,  (pp. 145–154 Chapter 8: Truncation)
 John H. Conway, Heidi Burgiel, Chaim Goodman-Strauss, The Symmetries of Things 2008,

External links 
 George Hart's Conway interpreter: generates polyhedra in VRML, taking Conway notation as input
 Prism Expansions  Toroid model

Polyhedra